Lipe may refer to:
 Ko Lipe, an island and resort in Thailand
 Lipe, Greater Poland Voivodeship, a village in Poland
 Lipe, Ljubljana, a village in the City Municipality of Ljubljana, Slovenia
 Lipe Trzecie, a village in Poland
 Lipe (Smederevo), a village near Smederevo, Serbia
 Lipe (Žagubica), a village near Žagubica, Serbia
 Bologna Guglielmo Marconi Airport near Bologna, Italy, ICAO code: LIPE
 Lipe (footballer), Brazilian footballer, full name Felipe Florencio da Silva

See also
 Lipophilic efficiency (LiPE), a parameter used in medicinal chemistry